Elizabeth Gaffney (born New York City, December 22, 1966) is an American novelist.  She graduated from Vassar College and holds an MFA in fiction from Brooklyn College.  She is the founder of the virtual writers space The 24-Hour Room, the editor at large of the literary magazine A Public Space and was a staff editor of The Paris Review for 16 years, under George Plimpton.  She teaches writing at New York University, Queens University of Charlotte, and A Public Space.

Publications

Novels 
Elizabeth Gaffney is the author of two novels published by Random House. Metropolis was published in 2005. When the World Was Young was published in 2015.

Short stories 
Elizabeth Gaffney has published short stories in various literary magazines including Virginia Quarterly Review, North American Review, Conjunctions and Michigan Quarterly Review. She won the 2019 Lawrence Prize for Fiction.

Translations 
Elizabeth Gaffney has translated four books from German: The Arbogast Case by Thomas Hettche, The Pollen Room by Zoë Jenny, Invisible Woman: Growing up Black in Germany, by Ika Hügel-Marshall and You Can't See the Elephants by Susan Kreller.

References

External links 
Official website
A Public Space website
The 24-Hour Room website

1966 births
Living people
21st-century American novelists
American women novelists
Vassar College alumni
Brooklyn College alumni
21st-century American women writers